Apazapan is a municipality located in the central zone in the State of Veracruz, about 65 km from state capital Xalapa. It has a surface of 65.80 km2. Apazapan was a population totonac in the days of the Spanish conquest that preserved the indigenous language up to the 19th century and there was one of the points marked in the Codex Dehesa, when the Nonoalcos de Zongolíca, crossed Cocolapa, Coscomatepec, Tepeyehualco, Chiconquiaco and for Apazapan they returned to Zongolíca. During the 16th century, it belonged to the marquisate of Paxaca's Valley started to Hernán Cortés.

Geographic Limits

The municipality of  Apazapan  is delimited to the north and to the east by Emiliano Zapata, to the south-east by Puente Nacional, to the south-west by Tlaltetela and to the west by Jalcomulco. It is watered by the river of Los Pescados or of  La Antigua.

Agriculture

It produces principally maize and beans.

Celebrations

In  Apazapan , in July takes place the celebration in honor to Santo Tomás Apostol, Patron of the town, and in December takes place the celebration in honor to Virgen de Guadalupe.

Weather

The weather in  Apazapan  is warm and wet all year with rains in summer and autumn.

References

External links 

  Municipal Official webpage
  Municipal Official Information

Municipalities of Veracruz